Marie Blancour (active 1650 – 1699), was a 17th-century French painter.	
	
She is known for only one signed work, a vase of flowers, that today is in the collection of the National Gallery, London. The art historian Sam Segal documented some notes about her work, but so far nothing else is known.

References

External links
 	
	

1630s births
1690s deaths
French women painters
17th-century French women artists